Margaret Hart  may refer to:

Margaret Hart (NCIS)
Margaret Hart Ferraro, née Margaret Hart and commonly known as Margie Hart, stripteaser

See also
Hart (surname)